Aleksey Silayev (born 4 January 1984) is a Russian ski jumper. He competed in the normal hill event at the 2002 Winter Olympics.

References

1984 births
Living people
Russian male ski jumpers
Olympic ski jumpers of Russia
Ski jumpers at the 2002 Winter Olympics
Sportspeople from Nizhny Novgorod